is a Japanese politician of the Japanese Communist Party, a member of the House of Representatives in the Diet (national legislature).

A native of Naha, Okinawa and graduate of Tokyo Education University, he taught at high schools. He was elected to the first of his three terms in the city assembly of Naha in 1985 and then to the House of Representatives for the first time in 2000.

In the 2014 Japanese general elections, he won Okinawa's 1st district. The election saw significant gains for the Japanese Communist Party, which raised its seat total from 8 to 21. Akamine's victory was JCP's first single-seat constituency victory in 18 years. His victory was part of a wave against the ruling Liberal Democratic Party in Okinawa caused by local anger over by a joint US-Japan decision to relocate a marine base to a residential area. LDP candidates lost all four Okinawan seats despite the party winning nationwide. In the 2017 general election, Akamine retained his seat.

References

External links 
 Official website in Japanese.

Members of the House of Representatives from Okinawa Prefecture
Japanese Communist Party politicians
Living people
1947 births
People from Naha
Japanese municipal councilors
University of Tsukuba alumni
21st-century Japanese politicians